Diabroctis  is a genus of beetles of the scarab beetle family.

Species
 Diabroctis cadmus Harold, 1868 
 Diabroctis mimas Linnaeus, 1758 
 Diabroctis mirabilis Harold, 1877

References

  Biolib

Scarabaeinae
Taxa named by Johannes von Nepomuk Franz Xaver Gistel
Scarabaeidae genera